This is a list of people elected Fellow of the Royal Society in 1928.

Fellows 

Gleb Anrep
Harry Bateman
Carl Hamilton Browning
Stanley Smith Cook
William David Dye
Clinton Coleridge Farr
Major Greenwood
Sir Walter Norman Haworth
John William Heslop-Harrison
David Keilin
Finlay Lorimer Kitchin
Francis Sowerby Macaulay
Samuel Barnett Schryver
Walter Stiles
Robert Whytlaw-Gray

Foreign members

Albert Auguste Toussaint Brachet
David Hilbert
Paul Langevin
Richard Friedrich Johannes Pfeiffer
Ludwig Prandtl
Richard Willstatter

Statute 12 fellows 

Sir William Symington McCormick
Alfred Moritz Mond, 1st Baron Melchett

References

1928
1928 in science
1928 in the United Kingdom